New Left (NL) is a social-democratic and democratic socialist political party in Croatia. It also promotes anti-fascism, environmentalism, and progressivism on social issues.

History
The party was established in December 2016, thanks to the efforts of left-wing intellectuals and civil activists including Dragan Markovina, Zoran Pusić, Vesna Teršelič, Nadežda Čačinovič and Nikola Devčić.

In March 2017, the New Left of Croatia announced their coalition with the left-wing political party Workers' Front for the local elections in Split and Zagreb. They later formed a coalition, for the Zagreb Assembly elections, with Možemo!, Zagreb is OURS (Zagreb je NAŠ!), Sustainable Development of Croatia - ORaH (Održivi razvoj Hrvatske or ORaH) and For the City (Za grad or ZG). 
The same parties formed the Green–Left Coalition for the 2020 parliamentary elections.

Electoral performance

Parliament of Croatia

Zagreb City Assembly

European Parliament

See also
Green–Left Coalition

References

2016 establishments in Croatia
Anti-fascism in Croatia
Anti-fascist organizations
Democratic socialist parties in Europe
Political parties established in 2016
Social democratic parties in Croatia
Social liberal parties